Senniyaviduthy is a village in the Orathanadu taluk of Thanjavur district, Tamil Nadu, India.

Demographics 

As per the 2001 census, Senniyaviduthy had a total population of 2,849 with 1,425 males and 1,424 females. The sex ratio was 999. The literacy rate was 57.22.

References 

 

Villages in Thanjavur district